Schengen Cloud is the concept and proposal of a Europe-only integrated electronic communication/system network which emerged after the whistleblowing and reporting on the mass surveillance activities of British and American security and intelligence agencies. Germany and France want to control their own networks without the United States being a middleman.

The proposal was first announced in 2011, but its status is unknown as of 2021.

References

Computer networks
Cloud
Proposed telecommunications infrastructure
Proposed infrastructure in Europe